Sir Arthur Levy Lever, 1st Baronet (17 November 1860 – 23 August 1924), known as Arthur Levy until 1896, was a British Liberal Party politician.

Background
Born Arthur Levy, a son of Joseph Levy, of Leicester. He was educated at University College School and privately. In 1896 he married Beatrice Falk. In 1900, they had a son, Tresham Joseph Philip Lever. Beatrice died in 1917. He assumed the surname of Lever in lieu of Levy by deed poll in 1896 and by Royal licence in 1911.

Military career
He joined the army. He served with the 2nd V.B. Royal Fusiliers. He reached the rank of Major before retiring. Following the outbreak of war in 1914, he was re-commissioned. He served in the European War as a Major in the 2/1st Battalion London Regiment of the Royal Fusiliers. He then moved to serve on the Headquarters’ Staff, Southern Command, with rank of Colonel. He was Deputy Director of Recruiting for South-Eastern Region in 1917.

Political career

Lever was elected Member of Parliament (MP) for Harwich in 1906.

He served as a Justice of the Peace in Essex. In 1906 he was appointed to the Royal Commission on Coast Erosion and Afforestation, serving until 1911. 
He lost his Harwich seat to the Conservatives at the January 1910 General Election. At the December 1910 General Election he stood unsuccessfully at Wolverhampton South.

In 1911 he was made a Baronet, of Hans Crescent in Chelsea. He was a Member of the London War Pensions Committee.
He was returned to the House of Commons at the 1922 general election as National Liberal MP for Hackney Central,

He stood down at the 1923 general election.

His elder brother Maurice Levy was also a Liberal politician and was created a Baronet in 1913.

Election results

References

External links 
 

1860 births
1924 deaths
Lever, Sir Arthur, 1st Baronet
Liberal Party (UK) MPs for English constituencies
National Liberal Party (UK, 1922) politicians
Hackney Members of Parliament
UK MPs 1906–1910
UK MPs 1922–1923
Jewish British politicians